Bezaleel Taft Sr. (November 3, 1750 – June 21, 1839) was an American Revolutionary War soldier, Captain and American legislator from Uxbridge, Massachusetts.

Early life
Bezaleel Taft Sr. was born to Lydia Chapin Taft and Josiah Taft at Uxbridge on 3 November 1750. He had six siblings. He went to school in Uxbridge and grew up in the immediate pre-Revolutionary War period in the Massachusetts colony. His mother Lydia Chapin Taft, was America's First Woman Voter in 1756 when young Bezaleel was just six years old. His father, Captain Josiah Taft, had fought in the French and Indian Wars, and died of natural causes when young Bezaleel just was 6.  His father died immediately prior to his mother's historic vote using her late husband Josiah's proxy in the important open town meeting Town Election to support the French and Indian War effort. Josiah had been a member of the Massachusetts General Court, or legislature of the colony in 1753, the year that Bezaleel was just 3 years of age. Bezaleel Taft Sr. was a loyal federalist.

Military service
He was a soldier who fought in the American Revolutionary War and held the rank of captain. He marched in the Lexington Alarm of April 19, 1775.

Marriage and children
After fighting in the Revolutionary war, he married Sara Richardson Taft. Their son Bezaleel Taft, Jr was born 8 September 1780. Their children are listed as Abigail, Bezaleel Taft Jr, Sarah (Sally), Caleb and Chloe Taft.

Legislative career and family life
Bezaleel followed his father's footsteps and was elected to the Massachusetts General Court after the United States gained its independence from Great Britain. He served in the state legislature as a representative and in the senate for over 30 years. His son, Bezaleel Taft Jr, would also serve in the Massachusetts General Court, and in the state Senate. He also served on various state commissions, Boards and the executive council.  Bazaleel Taft's 1794 "Georgian" architectural style home, is today a fine eating establishment south of Uxbridge center. A Hessian sword is embedded in the wall of this home, as partial evidence that British "Hessian" Forces, once passed through the historic Blackstone River Valley during the American Revolutionary War. The famous Taft family in America descended from a common ancestor, Robert Taft Sr, Bazaleel Taft Sr.'s great grandfather. Robert Taft Sr.'s first homestead was in Mendon, in what later became the town of Uxbridge. The Taft family is a dynasty in American politics in a number of states, throughout the USA, but especially in Ohio. William Howard Taft, President of the United States, was from this same family.

Hon. Bezaleel Taft  Sr. died at the age of 89 on June 21, 1839, at Uxbridge after a long and distinguished career in public service.

See also
Hon. Bazaleel Taft House
Taft family
The Tafts of Mendon and Uxbridge
National Register of Historic Places listings in Uxbridge, Massachusetts

Notes

External links
Bezaleel Taft Sr. House, now the Cocke n' Kettle, Historic Corridor

Taft family
1750 births
1839 deaths
People from Uxbridge, Massachusetts
Massachusetts militiamen in the American Revolution
Massachusetts state senators